"I'll Still Love You" is a song written by American singer-songwriter Jim Weatherly. First recorded for and Weatherly's 1974 album The Songs of Jim Weatherly, the single release peaked at No. 9 on the Billboard Hot Country Singles chart, No. 14 on the Billboard Easy Listening chart, and No. 87 on the Billboard Hot 100. It also charted in Canada.

Chart performance

References

1974 singles
1974 songs
Buddah Records singles
Songs written by Jim Weatherly